"Kung Fu" is a song by American rapper YBN Cordae, released in July 2018. It is the lead single from YBN's only mixtape, YBN: The Mixtape (2018). Produced by Take a Daytrip, it is considered Cordae's breakout single.

Critical reception
The song received generally positive reviews from music critics. Alex Zidel of HotNewHipHop gave the song a "Very Hottttt" rating and wrote, "With seemingly unlimited potential, Cordae's 'Kung Fu' has the rapper exploring his flows and melodies, going hard on an original loop, produced by Day Trip. With his exposure gaining by the day, Cordae is definitely worth your attention. Where does 'Kung Fu' rank in terms of his previous singles?" Trey Alston of Highsnobiety had a mixed response to the song, calling it "a little rough around the edges" and writing, "The production, while fitting of the ominous nature of most of the tracks on YBN: The Mixtape, isn't Cordae's forte. If he believes it is, he needs to take a long, hard, look in the mirror. Lyrical rap is at odds with new age's trap-esque beat catalog. Mixing the two just doesn't sound as good, no matter who does it." The song was ranked number 2 on The Washington Post's list of "The best DMV rap songs and albums of 2018".

Music video
A music video for the song was directed by PplCallMeAce and released on July 11, 2018. It finds Cordae hanging out on the block with boys and girls, and riding in a lime green Mercedes-Benz G-Class through a residential neighborhood.

Certifications

References

2018 singles
2018 songs
Cordae songs
Song recordings produced by Take a Daytrip